James Bryce LLD FRSE (22 oct 1806, in Killaig, Coleraine, Londonderry – 11 July 1877, in Inverfarigaig, Scotland) was an Irish mathematician, naturalist and geologist.

Life
He was the third son of Rev James Bryce (1767–1857), and of Catherine Annan of Auchtermuchty in Fife, and was born at Killaig, near Coleraine, on 23 October 1806. 
He was educated first by his father and eldest brother, the Rev. Dr. Bryce, and afterwards at the university of Glasgow, where he graduated B.A. in 1828, having distinguished himself in classical studies. 

In 1826, Bryce was appointed Master of the Mathematical and Commercial Department of Belfast Academical Institution. He was Secretary of the Belfast Natural History Society from its foundation.

He had intended to study for the bar, but, finding this beyond his means, adopted the profession of teaching, and became mathematical master in the Belfast Academy, a foundation school of considerably more prestige in Ulster. 
In 1836, he married Margaret, daughter of James Young of Abbeyville, county Antrim, and in 1840 was appointed to the high school of Glasgow, the ancient public grammar school of that city, and held this office till his resignation in 1874. 
He was a brilliant and successful teacher both of mathematics and geography, but his special interest lay in the study of natural history. 

He devoted himself to geological researches, first in the north of Ireland, and afterwards in Scotland and northern England. 
He began in 1834 to write and publish articles on the fossils of the lias, greensand, and chalk beds in Antrim (the first appeared in the 'Philosophical Magazine' for that year), and these having attracted the notice of Sir Roderick Murchison and Sir Charles Lyell. 
He was a Fellow of the Geological Society of London and a Fellow of the Geological Society of Dublin. 

His more important papers (among which may be found the first complete investigation and description of the structure of the Giant's Causeway) appeared in the 'Transactions' of the London society, others in the 'Proceedings' of the Natural History Society of Belfast and of the Philosophical Society of Glasgow, of which he was more than once president. 
He also wrote 'A Treatise on Algebra,' which went through several editions, an introduction to 'Mathematical Astronomy and Geography.' 
'A Cyclopœdia of Geography.' and a book on 'Arran and the other Clyde islands,' with special reference to their geology and antiquities. He was a warm advocate of the more general introduction into schools of the teaching of natural history as well as natural science, and set the example of giving teaching voluntarily in these subjects, for which there was in his day no regular provision in the high schools of Scotland. 

In 1868, he received from his university, in the reform of which he had borne a leading part, the honorary degree of LL.D. 
After resigning his post at Glasgow, he settled in Edinburgh, and published his later contributions to geology in the 'Transactions of the Royal Society of Edinburgh.' He was a keen and accurate observer, and having an ardent love of nature and great physical activity, continued his field work in the highlands of Scotland with unflagging zeal to the end of his life. 

While examining a remarkable mass of eruptive granite at Inverfarigaig, on the shores of Loch Ness, he disturbed some loose stones by the strokes of his hammer, and caused the blocks above to fall on him, killing him instantaneously, 11 July 1877. 

He is buried in the south-west section of the Grange Cemetery in Edinburgh. The grave is at the west end of a central east-west avenue in that section. His wife Margaret lies with him as does his son, John Annan Bryce (1843–1923) who served as MP to Inverness.

Works
1831 Tables of simple minerals, rocks, and shells : with local catalogues of species : for the use of the students of natural history in the Belfast Academy. Belfast, Simms and M'Intyre
 1834 An account of the celebrated Portrush rock. Journal of the Geological Society of Dublin 2: 166–174
 1837 A treatise on the elements of algebra Edinburgh, Adam and Charles Black
1837 On the geological structure of the north-eastern part of the county of Antrim. Transactions of the Geological Society of London 5: 69–81
1848 First principles of geography and astronomy : with the use of globes, Griffin
1852 Geological notices of the environs of Belfast, the east coast of Antrim, and the Giant's Causeway  Dublin, James McGlashan
1870? The International Atlas and Geography: Modern, Historical, Classical and Physical.London. Collins & Sons.

References

Sources

External link 
 

Irish naturalists
Irish zoologists
1806 births
1877 deaths
Irish mathematicians
Alumni of the University of Glasgow